The Rebecca Caudill Young Readers' Book Award (RCYRBA) is an annual award given to the author of the book voted most outstanding by students in grades four through eight in participating Illinois schools and libraries. It is named in honor of children's author Rebecca Caudill, who lived and worked in Urbana, Illinois, and has been presented annually since 1988. It is administered by a volunteer board of directors and presented in cooperation with the Illinois Association of Teachers of English, the Illinois Reading Council, and the Illinois School Library Media Association.

Books honored by this award are selected by a popular vote taken of students between the fourth and eighth grades in the State of Illinois. Books are nominated two years in advance of a selection year by students, teachers, and school and public librarians. The nominations are narrowed down to twenty choices by the 70-80 member RCYRBA Evaluator's Committee, and put forward as that year's "Master List." Participating schools and public libraries then collect votes from children starting during the fall of the prior year, up through the end of February in the awarding year, and the award winner is announced each March.

Winning books 
2018: A Night Divided, by Jennifer A. Nielsen 
2017: The Crossover, by Kwame Alexander
2016: Michael Vey: The Prisoner of Cell 25, by Richard Paul Evans
2015: Legend, by Marie Lu
2014: Wonder, by R. J. Palacio
2013: Smile, by Raina Telgemeier
2012: Powerless, by Matthew Cody 
2011: The Hunger Games, by Suzanne Collins
2010: All the Lovely Bad Ones, by Mary Downing Hahn
2009: The Lightning Thief, by Rick Riordan
2008: Drums, Girls, & Dangerous Pie, by Jordan Sonnenblick
2007: So B. It, by Sarah Weeks
2006: Eragon, by Christopher Paolini
2005: Hoot, by Carl Hiaasen
2004: Stormbreakers, by Anthony Horowitz
2003: Fever, 1793, by Laurie Halse Anderson
2002: Holes, by Louis Sachar
2001: Harry Potter and the Sorcerer's Stone, by J. K. Rowling
2000: Ella Enchanted, by Gail Carson Levine
1999: Frindle, by Andrew Clements
1998: Mick Harte Was Here, by Barbara Park
1997: The Best School Year Ever, by Barbara Robinson
1996: The Giver, by Lois Lowry
1995: Flight Number 116 is Down, by Caroline Cooney
1994: Shiloh, by Phyllis Reynolds Naylor
1993: Maniac Magee, by Jerry Spinelli
1992: Number the Stars, by Lois Lowry
1991: Matilda, by Roald Dahl
1990: Wait Till Helen Comes: A Ghost Story, by Mary Downing Hahn
1989: The Dollhouse Murders, by Betty Ren Wright
1988: The Indian in the Cupboard, by Lynne Reid Banks

References

External links
 
 Illinois School Library Media Association – point of entry to all four statewide reader's choice book awards
Meet Rebecca Caudill (Champaign Public Library)
Meet Caudill's daughter (Champaign Public Library)

American children's literary awards
1988 establishments in Illinois
Awards established in 1988
Illinois education-related lists
Illinois culture